Shilinotrechus fusiformis is a species of beetle in the family Carabidae, the only species in the genus Shilinotrechus.

References

Trechinae